Stanmore Country Park could refer to:

Stanmore Country Park, Bridgnorth
Stanmore Country Park, London